Karlskoga is the municipal seat of Karlskoga Municipality and the second-largest city in Värmland.

Karlskoga may also refer to:

Places

Sweden 

 Karlskoga Municipality, municipality in Örebro County
 Karlskoga Socken, socken

Sports 

 Karlskoga Motorstadion, motorsport race track
 Karlskoga IF
 BIK Karlskoga, ice hockey team